The 2011 Première Division (Ligue de N'Djaména) was the 24th season of the Chad Premier League, the top Chadian league for association football clubs, since its establishment in 1988. The season started on 16 January 2011 and concluded in June 2011.

It was the second time that Ligue de N'Djaména, championship where only clubs from N'Djamena participated, was considered a National Championship.

Tourbillon came into the season as defending champions of the 2010 season.

Foullah Edifice won the title with 43 points, and +23 goal-difference.

Teams 

The participating teams were:

AS CotonTchad (N'Djamena)
AS DGSSIE (N'Djamena)
Elect-Sport FC (N'Djamena)
Foullah Edifice FC (N'Djamena)
Gazelle FC (N'Djamena)
Geyser (N'Djamena)
Postel 2000 (N'Djamena)
Renaissance FC (N'Djamena)
Toumai FC (N'Djamena)
Tourbillon FC (N'Djamena)

Personnel and kits

Note: Flags indicate national team as has been defined under FIFA eligibility rules. Players may hold more than one non-FIFA nationality.

Results

League table

References

External links 

Chad